Brookfield is a city located in Waukesha County, Wisconsin, United States in the Milwaukee metropolitan area. It had a population of 41,464 at the 2020 census. Brookfield is the third-largest city in Waukesha County. The city is adjacent to the Town of Brookfield.

History

Brookfield is west of Milwaukee in Waukesha County in an area originally inhabited by Potawatomi Indians. The first white settler, William Howe, arrived in 1820 with a Presidential Land Grant giving him title to the area. Soon after, Robert Curren bought a claim in 1836 and established a tavern and inn.

In May 1838, Jacques View Jr., with a large party of white settlers, led the local Potawatomi west. Caroline Quiner, the mother of Laura Ingalls Wilder, was born in a cabin in 1839 in what is now the City of Brookfield, near the current intersection of Brookfield Road and Davidson Road. By 1839, the population needed a school house, as the 1840 census showed a population of 148. In these 1840s, George Gebhardt started trading with the surrounding Potawatomi and Menominee neighbors. 1843 is when the first church was built, by the Irish Catholic congregation, named St. Dominic. 1848 was when telegraph lines were laid through Brookfield, towards Waukesha. Communication was made easier due to this. In 1849, cholera reached Brookfield, and one Laura Grover recalls, "The death-like stillness was appalling; nothing was seen but the death carts rolling round the streets gathering the recent dead... I believe there were fifty deaths from cholera that day." The same year, 64 Brookfield residents voted in favor of giving suffrage to black residents, and 0 the other way. In 1850, cholera again went through Brookfield, and according to one Earl Thayer, "The cholera returned... more terrible than the year before. People literally died walking along the streets. Official reports put the toll at over 300."

In 1850, the Milwaukee and Mississippi Railroad (now the Canadian Pacific Rail) built a railroad through the town, which in 1853 erected a depot, forming the Brookfield Junction. In the year 1850, the Town of Brookfield had 1,944 inhabitants and in land area covered 36 square miles. The town slowly grew over following years, with the economy being mostly agricultural, with Brookfield Junction serving as a commercial center for the surrounding farms. The Civil War had little effect on this town, despite the severe losses of members serving from the state. "More than 12,000 died: 3,802 were killed in action or died of wounds and 8,499 died from disease, exposure, and other causes." In 1867, a second rail depot was constructed, which still stands.

In the 1900s, Brookfield gained a new reputation. Waukesha County was called Cow County, U.S.A., as according to advertisers, they claimed that in the county there were more cows than people. This was, of course, fantastical, although there were cows. This did help cement Wisconsin's dairy reputation. WWI, one of the biggest wars in history, also didn't have too much of an effect on Brookfield and how we know it today. The so-called Spanish flu, however, did kill many people, but not as many as cholera had in the past. On May 31, 1914, a tornado hit, devastating the farmers and the rural area.

This quiet, rural atmosphere attracted one notorious resident, Al Capone, as he established an area to live and a distillery on Brookfield Road. In 1928, the first suburban development, Kinsey's Garvendale, a residential subdivision, was created. Early subdivisions grew slowly due to the Great Depression hitting a year later, affecting its growth and killing demand.

Development in Brookfield began to increase after the Second World War. Suburban development was encouraged by a scarcity of urban area housing, the baby boom, and government sponsored building programs, which further grew the town, and after several annexations of neighboring communities, an incorporation drive started. The City of Brookfield was incorporated from the town of Brookfield, a portion of which still survives along the city's western edge, on August 14, 1954. The first mayor was Franklin Wirth, and he oversaw the new city, which at the time had a population of 7,900 and covered an area of 17.5 square miles. Much of the land was still in agricultural use, so the city's founders encouraged orderly development of office and industrial areas to cause the community to function with strong industrial and commercial base.

Today, Brookfield covers 27.66 square miles, and numbers 37,920 residents.

Geography and climate
The sub-continental divide passes through Brookfield; on the eastern side of this divide, easily marked by the crest at Calhoun Road and Capitol Drive, water flows to Lake Michigan on its way to the Gulf of Saint Lawrence; on the western side of this divide, water flows to the Fox River of Illinois and Wisconsin on its way to the Mississippi River and the Gulf of Mexico.

There is a heron rookery on a site northwest of Capitol Drive and Brookfield Road.

The Köppen-Geiger climate classification system classifies its climate as humid continental (Dfa).

Demographics

2010 census
As of the census of 2010, there were 37,920 people, 14,576 households, and 10,999 families residing in the city. The racial makeup of the city was 90.0% White, 1.2% African American, 0.2% Native American, 6.7% Asian, 0.5% from other races, and 1.4% from two or more races. Hispanic or Latino of any race were 2.2% of the population.

There were 14,576 households, of which 31.5% had children under the age of 18 living with them, 67.4% were married couples living together, 5.4% had a female householder with no husband present, 2.6% had a male householder with no wife present, and 24.5% were non-families. 21.4% of all households were made up of individuals, and 11.9% had someone living alone who was 65 years of age or older. The average household size was 2.57 and the average family size was 3.01.

The median age in the city was 46.7 years. 23.5% of residents were under the age of 18; 5.2% were between the ages of 18 and 24; 18.5% were from 25 to 44; 33% were from 45 to 64; and 19.9% were 65 years of age or older. The gender makeup of the city was 48.5% male and 51.5% female.

2000 census
As of the census of 2000, there were 38,649 people, 13,891 households, and 11,223 families residing in the city. The population density was 1,421.1 people per square mile (548.6/km2). There were 14,208 housing units at an average density of 522.4 per square mile (201.7/km2). The racial makeup of the city was 94.20 percent White, 3.83 percent Asian, 0.83 percent Black or African American, 0.09 percent Native American, 0.02 percent Pacific Islander, 0.23 percent from other races, and 0.81 percent from two or more races. 1.17 percent of the population were Hispanic or Latino of any race.

There were 13,891 households, out of which 36.1 percent had children under age 18 living with them, 73.1 percent were married couples living together, 5.5 percent had a female householder with no husband present, and 19.2 percent were non-families. 16.7 percent of all households were made up of individuals, and 9.0 percent had someone living alone who was 65 years old or older. The average household size was 2.74 people and the average family size was 3.09 people.

In the city, the population was spread out, with 26.8 percent under age 18, 4.6 percent from 18 years old to 24 years old, 23.2 percent from 25 years old to 44 years old, 27.8 percent from 45 years old to 64 years old, and 17.6 percent who were 65 years old or older. The median age was 42 years. For every 100 females, there were 93.7 males.  For every 100 females age 18 and over, there were 90.8 males.

The median income for a household in the city was $76,225, and the median income for a family was $83,691. Males had a median income of $62,351 versus $37,589 for females. The per capita income for the city was $37,292. 2.2 percent of the population and 1.4 percent of families were below the poverty line. Out of the total population, 2.4 percent of those under age 18 and 3.4 percent of those 65 years old and older were living below the poverty line.

Economy 
Fiserv is headquartered in Brookfield. The firm provides financial services technology (software, for the most part) for banks, thrifts, credit unions, securities broker dealers, leasing and finance companies, and retailers, among others. Its 2016 revenue was approximately $5.5 billion.

Fedex's SmartPost business unit is also headquartered in Brookfield.

Transportation
Capitol Airport (02C) serves the city and surrounding communities.

Government
Brookfield has a mayor–council government. The mayor is elected to a four-year term. On April 1, 2014, incumbent mayor Steve Ponto again defeated former two-term Mayor Jeff Speaker by a vote of 4,512 to 2,539. On April 3, 2018, incumbent mayor Steve Ponto ran unopposed for mayor.

Brookfield is represented by Scott Fitzgerald (R) in the United States House of Representatives, and by Ron Johnson (R) and Tammy Baldwin (D) in the United States Senate. Brookfield is represented by Dale Kooyenga (R) in the Wisconsin State Senate and Sara Rodriguez (D) and Robyn Beckley Vining (D) in the Wisconsin State Assembly.

Common Council
The Common Council is composed of 14 aldermen, with two representing each of seven districts. They serve four-year terms, with one member from each district up for election every other year. The aldermen set policy and have extensive financial control, but are not engaged in daily operational management.

Education
The Elmbrook School District serves residents of Brookfield excluding a small section of southwest Brookfield, which is in the Waukesha School District. Private schools include St. Dominic Catholic School, St. John Vianney Catholic Church, St. Luke Catholic School, St. Joseph's Catholic School, Elm Grove Lutheran School, Brookfield Christian School, and Brookfield Academy. Private high schools located within the Brookfield city limits include Brookfield Academy and Heritage Christian School, West Suburban Christian Academy.

Tourism

Brookfield offers shopping, fine dining, outdoor golf and parks.  Brookfield's concert hall is the Sharon Lynne Wilson Center for the Arts located in Mitchell Park. Brookfield's main beach is located at Fox Brook Park where hiking in natural preserves, sailing, biking and golfing are also available.

Brookfield Square is the main shopping mall for the city and also serves as a commercial anchor to the Bluemound Road shopping district serving the western suburbs of Milwaukee and Waukesha County. Brookfield has off-road bike paths throughout the city.

Brookfield Days is held annually in June, at Wirth Park supported by the local community. A farmer's market runs on weekends in summer months at the Brookfield City Hall.

The Elmbrook Historical Society hosts several events annually celebrating the lives of early Brookfield settlers, including Caroline Ingalls, who was born in the Brookfield area. The city is often visited by fans of her daughter, Laura, author of the Little House on the Prairie book series.

Notable people

Noel Jenke (Former NFL Player who lived in Brookfield)
 John Anderson, NFL player
 Ken Anderson, pro wrestler known as Mr. Kennedy
 Al Capone, noted Chicago mobster, owned a Brookfield home where moonshine was made
 Bill Carollo, NFL official
 Kip Carpenter, 2002, 2006 Olympian, bronze medalist in speedskating
 Henry J. Clasen, Wisconsin State Representative and businessman
 Tom Dougherty, MLB player
 Arpad Elo, inventor of Elo rating system for chess, professor at Marquette
 Susan Engeleiter, former administrator of the Small Business Administration
 Herman Finger, entrepreneurial lumberman
 Aubrey Foard, Charlotte Symphony Orchestra principal tuba
 Troy Grosenick, professional ice hockey goaltender for the Nashville Predators
 Doc Hamann, MLB player
 Merle Harmon, Hall of Fame broadcaster and entrepreneur
 Kenny Harrison, world champion track and field athlete, Olympic gold medalist
 Nathan Hatch (1757–1847), soldier in American Revolutionary War and War of 1812; farmed in Brookfield from 1842 to 1847 and interred in Brookfield's Oak Hill Cemetery
 Caroline Ingalls (1839–1924), born in what is today the city of Brookfield (then Town of Brookfield), mother of Laura Ingalls Wilder
 Ken Jungels, MLB player
 Ted Kanavas (1961–2017), Wisconsin State Senate
 Matt Katula, NFL player
 Joe Kuether, professional poker player
 Robert Andrew "Bob" Long, wide receiver for Green Bay Packers during Vince Lombardi era
 Arie Luyendyk, two-time Indianapolis 500 winner
 Eddie Mathews, baseball player (lived in Brookfield during career)
 Al McGuire, former NCAA basketball coach and commentator (lived in Brookfield toward the end of his life)
 Fritz Mollwitz, MLB player
 Zane Navratil, pickleball player
 Brad Nortman, NFL punter
 Joel Rechlicz, NHL Hockey player
 Leslie Osborne, member of Women's Professional Soccer team Boston Breakers and the U.S. national team
 Joe Panos, football player for Philadelphia Eagles, Buffalo Bills
 James Kerr Proudfit, U.S. Army general
 Martin P. Robinson, puppeteer for Telly Monster, Mr. Snuffleupagus and Slimey on Sesame Street since 1980; graduate of Brookfield East High School
 Herman Schatz, Wisconsin State Representative and blacksmith
 Molly Seidel, 2020 Tokyo Olympic Bronze Medal marathon winner
 Richie Sexson, retired MLB player (lived here when he played for Milwaukee Brewers)
 Paul Spaeth, noted composer and musician
 Adam Stockhausen, Oscar-winning production designer
 John Patten Story, U.S. Army major general
 Joe Thomas, football player for Cleveland Browns
 Frank Urban, Wisconsin State Assembly
 John M. Young, Wisconsin State Assembly

Sister city

Brookfield has one sister city:
 Seligenstadt, Hesse, Germany

See also
 2012 Azana Spa shooting
 2005 Living Church of God shooting
 Milwaukee Electric Tool Corporation

References

External links
 Official website

Cities in Wisconsin
Cities in Waukesha County, Wisconsin
1954 establishments in Wisconsin